The second season of The Bachelor New Zealand stars Jordan Mauger, a 32 year old television and film producer. The season contains 23 bachelorettes and premiered on March 7, 2016.

Contestants

The following is the list of bachelorettes for Season Two:

Call-out order

 This contestant won
 This contestant received one of the first impression roses
 This contestant received a rose during the date
 This contestant received a rose outside of a date or the rose ceremony
 This contestant was eliminated
 This contestant quit

Episodes

Episode 1

The bachelorettes arrived at the mansion and the first rose ceremony took place.

Eliminated: Emily Rose, Freya & Harmony

Episode 2

Single Date: Sarah - Went wakeboarding and had ice-cream atop the Skytower.

Group Date: Fleur, Storm, Anna, Kate, Gabrielle, Erin & Danielle - Played beach volleyball and had a BBQ. Fleur got some one on one time and received a rose.

Eliminated: Catherine

Episode 3

Single Date: Storm - Went kayaking and spent the evening on a yacht.

Group Date: Nicole, Alicia, Anna, Amanda & Naz - Washed dogs and had a water fight. Took Nicole for some one on one time.

Eliminated: Anna

Quit:  Metz

Episode 4

Single Date: Shari - Went to the Auckland Art Gallery and toured it alone together and had dinner.

Group Date: Lindsey, Gabrielle, Nicole, Naz, Erin, Lara, Danielle, Alicia, Rebecca, Claudia, Kate & Amanda - Went paintballing. Erin had some one on one time with Jordan.

Eliminated: Lindsey

Episode 5

Group Date: Danielle, Lara, Sarah, Ceri & Gabrielle - Raced Suzuki Swifts around Hampton Downs racetrack. Lara was the fastest and got some one on one time with Jordan and received a rose.

Single Date: Kate - Went horseback riding along the beach and had wine and cheese in a glade where Kate was given a rose.

Eliminated: Amanda

Episode 6

Group Date: Gabrielle, Naz & Claudia - Took a speedboat onto the water and went jetskiing. Gabrielle got some one on one time and she and Jordan got closer.

Single Date: Rebecca - Went on a theme park date at Rainbow's End.
 
Eliminated: Claudia

Episode 7

The remaining bachelorettes flew with Jordan to Hawaii.

Single Date: Ceri - Strolled along the beach and had a picnic inside when it started to rain. Then Ceri got her dream date of a helicopter ride over Hawaii.

Group Date: Fleur, Sarah, Shari, Alicia, Lara, Storm & Nicole - Split into teams and went catamaran racing. He picked Alicia for some one on one time.

Eliminated: Danielle

Episode 8

Single Date: Fleur - Visited a Hawaiian volcano and had dinner together.

Group Date: Naz, Nicole, Gabrielle, Kate & Erin - Went quad-biking and then zip lining through the Hawaiian jungle. Took Gabrielle for some one on one time.

Quit: Nicole

Eliminated: Lara

Episode 9

Single Date: Naz - Had a flight in a seaplane. Took a speedboat out into the ocean.

Group Date: Sarah, Shari, Storm, Rebecca & Kate - Had a luau.

Eliminated: Alicia

Episode 10

Single Date: Erin - Took a sailboat out into the ocean and went snorkeling. After sunset they watched fireworks.

Group Date: Rebecca, Ceri, Sarah & Gabrielle - Went foraging for their own food in the countryside and had a chef cook for them. Rebecca was taken away for some one on one time.

Eliminated: Shari

Episode 11

Jordan and the bachelorettes head to sunny Brisbane, Australia.

Single Date: Storm - They go into the bush where a luxury tent is set up where they eat and have a couples massage down by the river with lanterns all around.

Group Date: Gabrielle, Kate & Sarah - Went abseiling, where Gabs faced her fear of heights and Sarah refused to partake. Kate was taken for some one on one time where they go kayaking.

Eliminated: Sarah

Episode 12

Single Date: Gabrielle - Took a helicopter to a lodge in the hillside where they had dinner and got cozy in the Jacuzzi.

Group Date - Storm, Fleur, Naz, Kate & Erin - Went horseback riding and corralled cows. Naz got some one on one time with Jordan.

Eliminated: Rebecca

Episode 13

Single Date: Ceri - Took a ride in a classic convertible car, something Jordan is passionate about.

Group Date: Ceri, Naz, Erin, Gabrielle, Kate, Storm & Fleur - Go to Australia Zoo to interact with Australian wildlife. Fleur got some one on one time at the zoo with Jordan.

Eliminated: Ceri

Episode 14

Jordan and the remaining bachelorettes left Brisbane and travelled to the Bay of Islands back in New Zealand.

Single Date: Naz - Hiked up a trail and enjoyed the view together. Watched the sun set and swam and the ocean.

Group Date: Gabrielle, Kate & Fleur - Went kayaking together and ended the paddle with a view of a beautiful waterfall. Gabrielle was taken for some one on one time with Jordan.

Eliminated: Storm

Episode 15

Single date: Kate - Kate and Jordan enjoyed a pub lunch together followed by paragliding.

Group Date: Naz, Erin & Fleur - Heading out on a tall ship together. Fleur was taken for some one on one time with Jordan.

Eliminated: Kate

Episode 16

Single date: Erin

Group Date: Naz & Gabrielle - Biking. Each got some one on one time with Jordan

Eliminated: Gabrielle

Notes

References

2016 New Zealand television seasons
New Zealand 02
Television shows filmed in New Zealand
Television shows filmed in Hawaii
Television shows filmed in Australia